Eric Redman (born January 26, 1946) is a former US politician, who was a Republican Idaho State Representative from 2014 to 2018 representing District 2 in the B seat. He chose not to run for reelection in 2018, and was succeeded by John Green.

Education and career
Redman was raised on a farm near Moscow, Idaho and graduated from Palouse High School in Palouse, Washington in 1964. He attended Washington State University on scholarship for two years before serving in the United States Air Force for four years during the Vietnam War.

Redman then made a career owning and operating several business and as an insurance agent, selling his agency to his children in 2012 before he ran for the legislature.

In 2021, Idaho Republican Party Chairman Tom Luna appointed Eric Redman to serve on Idaho's Independent Redistricting Commission.

Idaho House of Representatives
In 2014, Redman ran against the one-term incumbent Ed Morse in the May Republican Primary, winning with 61% of the vote. He was unopposed in the General Election.

In 2016, Redman defeated Alan Littlejohn in the Republican Primary with 63.09% of the vote. He was opposed by Richard Kohles in the general election, winning with 75.60% of the vote.

Redman supported Ted Cruz in the Republican Party presidential primaries, 2016.

Committee assignments
In the 2017 session, Redman sat on the Commerce and Human Resources, Health and Welfare, and Local Government Committees.

Electoral history

References

External links
Eric Redman at the Idaho Legislature
site

Living people
People from Moscow, Idaho
Republican Party members of the Idaho House of Representatives
21st-century American politicians
Washington State University alumni
1946 births
United States Air Force personnel of the Vietnam War